Aluminium iodide  is a chemical compound containing aluminium and iodine. The hexahydrate is obtained from a reaction between metallic aluminum or aluminum hydroxide with hydrogen iodide or hydroiodic acid. Like the related chloride and bromide,  is a strong Lewis acid and will absorb water from the atmosphere. It is employed as a reagent for the scission of certain kinds of C-O and N-O bonds. It cleaves aryl ethers and deoxygenates epoxides.

Structure
The structure of monomeric and dimeric forms have been characterized in the gas phase. The dimer is described as floppy with an equilibrium geometry of D2h.

Aluminium(I) iodide

The name "aluminium iodide" is widely assumed to describe the triiodide or its dimer. In fact, a monoiodide also enjoys a role in the Al–I system, although the compound AlI is unstable at room temperature relative to the triiodide:
3AlI -> AlI3 + 2Al
An illustrative derivative of aluminium monoiodide is the cyclic adduct formed with triethylamine, .

References

External links

Iodides
iodide
Metal halides